Troop Beverly Hills is a 1989 American comedy film. It is produced by the Weintraub Entertainment Group and directed by Jeff Kanew, starring Shelley Long, Craig T. Nelson, Betty Thomas, Mary Gross, Stephanie Beacham and introducing Jenny Lewis as Hannah Nefler. The film features a host of young actors, including Carla Gugino, Kellie Martin, Emily Schulman, Ami Foster, and Tori Spelling.

The film follows Beverly Hills housewife Phyllis Nefler (Shelley Long) as she decides to become a leader of a local troop of Wilderness Girls to prove to her husband she can finish anything she sets her mind to. Phyllis becomes an unlikely den mother to the girls, who aren’t taken seriously by other troops. When Phyllis falls afoul of a rival troop leader, the girls face the possibility of having their group dissolved—unless they can prove their wilderness skills at the annual jamboree.

Though the film was not a financial success during its release, it has since acquired a cult following as a 1980s kids’ movie with a feminist message. In 2020, a sequel was announced to be in development.

Plot
Phyllis Nefler is a socialite wife recently separated from her husband Freddy, a wealthy owner of an auto shop chain. In an attempt to maintain the relationship with her daughter Hannah during the contentious divorce, Phyllis becomes the den mother of Hannah's unruly, leaderless local girl scout troop of Wilderness Girls.

Their first campout results in the troop getting caught in a rain squall, prompting Phyllis to take the girls to “camp out” at the Beverly Hills Hotel. Despite her lack of wilderness skills, Phyllis demonstrates an unwavering commitment to the girls' well-being and becomes a surrogate mother to the troop. She resolves to teach the girls how to survive in "the wilds of Beverly Hills", even customizing new merit badges for her troop.

Phyllis' unorthodox methods run afoul of another scout leader, Velda Plendor, a mean-spirited, retired army nurse who runs the Culver City "Red Feathers", of which her own daughter Cleo is a member of. Because Velda has considerable influence at the regional council level, she declares Phyllis' customized merit badges ineligible. Velda sends her assistant troop leader Annie Herman to infiltrate Troop Beverly Hills and sabotage them. Velda and Annie’s attempts at sabotage prove unsuccessful, as Velda’s boss and regional council leader Frances Temple states that while Phyllis may have unusual methods, she has taken an active interest in these girls and is trying to help them learn to survive their personal environment.

Troop Beverly Hills can gain recognition from the regional council by passing a series of tests at an upcoming Jamboree. In order to qualify, the troop needs to sell 1,000 boxes of cookies. To prevent this, Velda one-ups Troop Beverly Hills by selling cookies in their own neighborhood. Annie breaks ties with Velda and sides with Phyllis. The Troop ends up selling over 4,000 boxes of cookies, more than enough to qualify for the Jamboree. At a party for the Troop, Velda takes her anger out on Annie, who snaps back, standing up to her superior for the first time.

Meanwhile, Phyllis reconnects with Freddy, who tells her he is proud she has accomplished something. However, Phyllis soon learns that Freddy still wants to proceed with the divorce, including seeking joint custody of Hannah, which devastates Phyllis. She decides to disband the troop, but Hannah and the other girls change her mind, telling Phyllis she has given them a new sense of self-esteem.

During the Jamboree, the Red Feathers trick Troop Beverly Hills during the competition by misdirecting them into a snake-infested swamp. Luckily, a skunk scares them into running through a shortcut, making them first in the qualifying event. The next day, Velda cheats again by cutting a rope bridge after her troop crosses and by leading them into a restricted area used only for hunting. However, Velda falls and breaks her ankle. The Red Feathers, now led by Cleo, abandon Velda for the sake of winning. Troop Beverly Hills repairs the bridge and finds Velda. Tessa diagnoses her broken ankle (and a severe personality disorder). The girls reluctantly carry her to the finish line after Phyllis reminds them that they have to be considerate to those in need — especially a fellow Wilderness Girl.

Though the Red Feathers cross the finish line first, they are disqualified because council law stipulates the leader must be with the troop. Troop Beverly Hills is declared the winners of the Jamboree and are recognized as Wilderness Girls. Frances fires Velda for cheating and for placing the Troop Beverly Hills girls in jeopardy as well as finally getting fed up with her overall rude and entitled behavior. Freddy, intrigued by Phyllis's complete turnaround, shows interest in calling off the divorce and they reconcile.

The next year, Troop Beverly Hills is the designated Poster Troop. Velda is forced to take a job at Kmart after her actions made her virtually unemployable, and a final scene shows her making a store-wide announcement about cookies.

Cast
 Shelley Long as Phyllis Nefler, a Beverly Hills socialite and the new leader of Wilderness Girls Troop Beverly Hills
 Craig T. Nelson as Freddy Nefler, Phyllis's entrepreneur husband and Hannah's estranged father
 Betty Thomas as Velda Plendor, the ruthless leader of a rival troop who is the main antagonist of the group and wants to get rid of Troop Beverly Hills
 Mary Gross as Annie Herman, Velda's assistant and spy, and later Phyllis' assistant
 Karen Kopins as Lisa, Freddy Nefler's new fiancée
 Jenny Lewis as Hannah Nefler, Phyllis and Freddy's daughter who just wants her mother to lead like a normal troop leader. She's also a skilled gymnast
 Emily Schulman as Tiffany Honigman, the daughter of a prominent Beverly Hills plastic surgeon
 Carla Gugino as Chica Barnfell, a stern girl who's generally left alone by her jet-setting parents
 Aquilina Soriano as Lily Marcigan, the daughter of Dictator Bong Bong and Karina (based on Ferdinand and Imelda Marcos respectively) who rule an unspecified Southeast Asian country
 Kellie Martin as Emily Coleman, the daughter of an unemployed actor
 Tasha Scott as Jasmine Shakar, the outspoken daughter of a well-known boxer
 Heather Hopper as Tessa DiBlasio, the daughter of a well-known movie director, and in many ways a genius who has learned a bit too much from her therapist.  
 Ami Foster as Claire Sprantz, a child actress/daughter of a romance novelist and a successful lawyer
 Audra Lindley as Frances Temple, the head leader of Los Angeles County Wilderness Girls who is undermined by Velda
 Stephanie Beacham as Vicki Sprantz, Claire's mother, romance novelist, and Phyllis' friend
 Edd Byrnes as Ross Coleman, Emily's father and an unemployed actor
 Shelley Morrison as Rosa, Phyllis' housekeeper who helps out with the troop
 Dinah Lacey as Cleo Plendor, Velda's daughter and a member of the Culver City Red Feathers
 Tori Spelling as Jamie, Cleo's friend and troopmate who helps sabotage Troop Beverly Hills
 Willie Garson as Bruce
 Mary Pat Gleason as a kindly troop leader
 Kareem Abdul-Jabbar as himself
 Frankie Avalon as himself
 Dr. Joyce Brothers as herself
 Annette Funicello as herself
 Robin Leach as himself
 Cheech Marin as himself
 Ted McGinley as himself
 Pia Zadora as herself
 Hilary Shepard as Salesgirl

Production
Writer and producer Ava Ostern Fries’ experience as a Girl Scout troop leader in Beverly Hills provided the inspiration for the film.

Many landmarks in Beverly Hills are seen throughout the film, including the Beverly Hills Hotel, Cristophe Salon, Jane Fonda's "Workout", Wolfgang Puck's Spago, and Rodeo Drive. Various celebrities, including Kareem Abdul-Jabbar and Cheech Marin, also make cameo appearances in the film.

Reception
Troop Beverly Hills was poorly received by critics during its release. On Rotten Tomatoes, it holds a rating of 14% based on 28 reviews. Roger Ebert criticized the film for not being the “merciless evisceration of the lifestyles of the rich” that he expected, but instead more of a morality story arc for Shelley Long’s character.

While some reviews lambasted the script for its formulaic underdog story, others chided the film for its attempt to portray   Beverly Hills youth as underdogs, with The Washington Post’s Rita Kempley writing, “Pity the poor little Beverlies: Children from lower income groups laugh at their Giorgio boutique backpacks. Then Velda strips the girls of the badges they've earned for facials and pricing jewelry. She further derides them for holding their camp-out at the Beverly Hills Hotel, where they tell horror stories about bad haircuts.”

Some critics called attention to Long’s comedic performance as one of the film’s strengths. Janet Maslin of The New York Times wrote, “‘Troop Beverly Hills’ is a one-idea movie, and the idea isn't new. But it isn't threadbare either, thanks to the indefatigable pluck of Shelley Long, who plays a spiritual sister to Private Benjamin”.

In the years since its release, the film has become a cult classic for its subtle feminist message and being illustrative of the 1980s, having gained newer audiences through repeat airings on Disney Channel in the 1990s. Writing for Elle in 2014, Elissa Strauss contended the film’s sympathy for its young protagonists, its refusal “to reduce the characters and setting down to a punch line,” and an “unrestrained celebration of girliness, glorious girliness” are precisely what has helped the film endure as a classic.

In a retrospective piece for Birth.Movies.Death, Ashlee Blackwell wrote, In the end, it's the troop’s persistence and support of each other, even in moments of doubt, that carries them to a win at the climatic Wilderness Jamboree competition…Troop Beverly Hills thoughtfully exposes the complexities of divorce, social/class culture and personal growth in a light comedy very much loyal to its time. The film tampers with audience expectations of people with money, blurring the lines of good/bad, rich/not rich. Troop Beverly Hills dared to tell young girls (and women) to never compromise the best of yourself for people or things…Even with its blemishes, Troop Beverly Hills’ heart was always in the right place. What a thrill.

In popular culture 
In the music video for her song "She's Not Me", Jenny Lewis, who played Hannah in the film, referenced the movie as part of her roles as a child actor. In the video, Lewis and actors Zosia Mamet, Vanessa Bayer, and Leo Fitzpatrick wear the Troop Beverly Hills uniforms.

References

External links
 
 
 
 
 

1989 films
1980s adventure comedy films
American adventure comedy films
1980s English-language films
Films set in Beverly Hills, California
Films shot in California
Films about children
Scouting in popular culture
Columbia Pictures films
Weintraub Entertainment Group films
Films directed by Jeff Kanew
Films scored by Randy Edelman
1989 comedy films
American female buddy films
1980s female buddy films
1980s feminist films
1980s American films